Transmembrane protein 127 (TMEM127) is a transmembrane protein which is encoded by the TMEM127 gene. It has been demonstrated to be a negative regulator MTOR signalling. TMEM127 is a tumor suppressor gene, inactivating germline mutations in which causes hereditary pheochromocytoma and paraganglioma.

References 

Tumor suppressor genes